Thomattuchal  is a village in Wayanad district in the state of Kerala, India.

Demographics
 India census, Thomattuchal had a population of 17744 with 8727 males and 9017 females.

Transportation
Thomattuchal can be accessed from Sultan Battery. The Periya ghat road connects Mananthavady to Kannur and Thalassery.  The Thamarassery mountain road connects Calicut with Kalpetta. The Kuttiady mountain road connects Vatakara with Kalpetta and Mananthavady. The Palchuram mountain road connects Kannur and Iritty with Mananthavady.  The road from Nilambur to Ooty is also connected to Wayanad through the village of Meppadi.

The nearest railway station is at Mysore and the nearest airports are Kozhikode International Airport-120 km, Bengaluru International Airport-290 km, and   Kannur International Airport, 58 km.

References

Villages in Wayanad district
Sultan Bathery area